The Women's 50m Sport Rifle 3x20 SH1 shooting event at the 2004 Summer Paralympics was competed  on 20 September. It was won by Her Myung Sook, representing .

Preliminary

20 Sept. 2004, 09:00

Final round

20 Sept. 2004, 13:00

References

W
Para